Peter Pavel Glavar (2 May 1721 – 24 January 1784) was a Carniolan Roman Catholic priest, beekeeper, writer, and businessman.

Glavar was born in Ljubljana and was an illegitimate and abandoned child of the Maltese noble Pietro Giacomo de Testaferrata and of a local servant. He was raised in Vopovlje in northern Carniola. As he was a quick learner, he went to study for a priest to Ljubljana and about 1738 to Graz, where he became a master of liberal arts. There he also got acquainted with economic theories of French physiocrats. His education was wide and he was fluent in several European languages.

Glavar returned to Carniola around 1743. He settled in Komenda in northern Carniola, where he established a school in 1751, and erected a benefice building with a library in 1752. The library still stands and comprises around 2,000 books from a multitude of fields of science and arts. A mighty lime tree in Komenda was presumably planted by Glavar in 1748 and has been named after him. Glavar collaborated with artists and ordered Franc Jelovšek to paint the beneficiary house and the local church. From 1754 until 1760, he edited the first Slovene-language parish family book, writing the data about the inhabitants of Komenda. In 1761–66, he erected the High-Baroque St. Anne's Church in Tunjice.

In 1766, Glavar bought Lanšprež Castle in Gomila near Mirna in the central Carniola, where he kept an apiary with about 200 quite profitable hives. He also established a beekeeping school there and wrote several texts on beekeeping, including Pogovor o čebelnih rojih (Discussion About Bee Swarms) from 1776–78, which was the first Slovene-language scholarly text, but was lost and was published only in 1976. He was a supporter of poor students. He died at Lanšprež Castle aged 62 years. His assets were distributed among the poor and used for the establishment of Glavar Hospital in Komenda in 1804.

In 2006, a TV-documentary was produced about Peter Pavel Glavar.

References

1721 births
1784 deaths
Clergy from Ljubljana
Carniolan beekeepers
Carniolan Roman Catholic priests
18th-century Carniolan writers
Carniolan businesspeople
Slovenian male writers
18th-century Slovenian writers
Slovenian non-fiction writers
Male non-fiction writers
Slovenian people of Maltese descent